Habenariol is a phenolic compound found in the semi-aquatic orchid Habenaria repens. It acts as a feeding deterrent against the freshwater crayfish Procambarus clarkii.

See also 
 Gastrodigenin, a phenolic compound found in other orchids

References 

Phenols
Habenaria